Greenclaws is a children's television series aired on the BBC between 3 January 1989 and 6 February 1990. It starred Nick Mercer and Stella Goodier, was written by Ursula Jones, directed by Adrian Mills, and produced by Christine Hewitt.

Content 

Greenclaws, played by Nick Mercer, was a big green monster who lived in a greenhouse. Every week, Iris (Stella Goodier) would visit Greenclaws.  They would put one of Greenclaws' fabulous seeds in a plant pot, put the plant pot inside a secret growing place in the Riddle Tree, wait for Owlma (a mechanical owl) to alert them that the plant was ready, answer three riddles/questions correctly from Owlma (which were always along the lines of "Twit twoo, twoo, twit twit twoo?" and then translated into English by Iris for her and Greenclaws to solve), then open the tree to find the plant had grown into something bearing unusual fruit. Each episode featured a song filmed (lip-synched) on location, most of which were written by Hilary James and Simon Mayor. There would also be a story told featuring relatives of Greenclaws while the plant was growing, accompanied by illustrations.

Only one series of Greenclaws was produced – reportedly due to the fact that some young pre-schoolers at which the series was aimed, were frightened by Greenclaws's appearance, regardless of his gentle-natured persona. Despite this, the series was repeated several times, including in a later-afternoon Children's BBC slot, where a slightly older demographic audience less likely to be intimidated by Greenclaws's appearance, would be watching.

Theme 

In the greenhouse, Greenclaws' greenhouse,
Greenclaws grows them amazing plants.
They're surprising, mystifying,
Greenclaws grows them crazy plants!

Notes 
Owlma is meant to be a female owl. The "Twit Twoo" call is actually two owls calling to each other. The female calls out the "twit" sound to which a male owl answers with a call of "twoo"

References

External links 

Greenclaws at ClassicKidsTV.co.uk
www.childrensmusic.co.uk

1989 British television series debuts
1990 British television series endings
1980s British children's television series
1990s British children's television series
BBC children's television shows
British television shows featuring puppetry
English-language television shows
Television series about monsters